Bommaipally is a village in Yadadri district of the Indian state of Telangana. It is administered under  Bhuvanagiri Municipality & Mandal of Bhongir revenue division.

References

Villages in Yadadri Bhuvanagiri district